Okolski is a Polish surname. Notable people with the surname include:

 Benjamin Okolski (born 1984), American pair skater
 Szymon Okolski (1580–1653), Polish-Lithuanian historian

Polish-language surnames